Marcin Kalkowski (born 6 November 1989 in Gdańsk, Poland) is a retired Polish footballer who played as a centre back.

References

 
 

Living people
1989 births
Polish footballers
Association football defenders
Sportspeople from Gdańsk
Górnik Łęczna players
Bałtyk Gdynia players
Jeziorak Iława players
UKS SMS Łódź players
GKS Bełchatów players
Gryf Wejherowo players
Ekstraklasa players
I liga players